Güeppi Airport  is an airport serving the town of Güeppi (es) in the Loreto Region of Peru. Güeppi is on the Putumayo River at Peru's tri-border with Colombia and Ecuador.

See also

Transport in Peru
List of airports in Peru

References

External links
OpenStreetMap - Güeppi
OurAirports - Güeppi
SkyVector - Gueppi
Güeppi Airport

Airports in Peru
Buildings and structures in Loreto Region